The Swiss Women's Basketball Championship, or SB League Women, is the highest tier level of women's professional club basketball competition in Switzerland.

History
The 2019–20 season ended prematurely due to the coronavirus pandemic in Switzerland and in March 2020 the Swiss Basketball Executive Committee announced that no team would be awarded the national championship title.

Current teams (2019-20)
BCF Elfic Fribourg
BC Winterthur
BBC Troistorrents
Genève Elite Basket
Hélios VS Basket
Espérance Sportive Pully
BC Alte Kanti Aarau
Nyon Basket Féminin
Riva Basket

Champions

Source

References

External links
 Profile at eurobasket.com

Switzerland
Basketball leagues in Switzerland
Sports leagues established in 1940
1940 establishments in Switzerland
Women's basketball in Switzerland
Professional sports leagues in Switzerland